Burqin Kanas Airport  is an airport that serves Burqin County and the nearby tourist destination Kanas Lake in Xinjiang, China.  It is located 50 kilometers south of the lake in Burqin County.  The airport was constructed in 2006 and opened on 15 August 2007. Until 2019, the airport was only open for flights in the summer.

In September 2020, Urumqi Air started flying to Kanas Airport using a Boeing 737-800 with a Kanas lake themed livery and interior.

Airlines and destinations

See also
List of airports in the People's Republic of China

References

Airports in Xinjiang
Airports established in 2007
2007 establishments in China
Altay Prefecture